Ngerebong in the village of Kesiman, Denpasar, means of assembly, the gathering of the god. Ngerebong is a tradition that is held by the people Hindu in Pura Pangrebongan. This tradition is usually done every six months in a calendar calendar Bali which is on the Sunday or Pon Redite wuku Medangsia. Usually the streets are closed when the tradition is being carried out, because people believe this tradition is a sacred tradition. Community Ngerebong ceremony began with prayers in temple.

References

Populated places in Bali